Ostlingothrips is a genus of thrips in the family Phlaeothripidae.

Species
 Ostlingothrips corini
 Ostlingothrips pastus

References

Phlaeothripidae
Thrips
Thrips genera